The Rayleigh Medal is a prize awarded annually by the Institute of Acoustics for "outstanding contributions to acoustics". The prize is named after John Strutt, 3rd Baron Rayleigh. It should not be confused with the medal of the same name awarded by the Institute of Physics.

List of recipients
Source: Institute of Acoustics

See also

 List of physics awards

References

Physics awards
British science and technology awards